The Killing Fields is a 1984 British biographical drama film about the Khmer Rouge regime in Cambodia, which is based on the experiences of two journalists: Cambodian Dith Pran and American Sydney Schanberg. It was directed by Roland Joffé and produced by David Puttnam for his company Goldcrest Films. Sam Waterston stars as Schanberg, Haing S. Ngor as Pran, Julian Sands as Jon Swain, and John Malkovich as Al Rockoff. The adaptation for the screen was written by Bruce Robinson; the musical score was written by Mike Oldfield and orchestrated by David Bedford.

The film was a success at the box office and an instant hit with critics. At the 57th Academy Awards it received seven Oscar nominations, including Best Picture; it won three, most notably Best Supporting Actor for Haing S. Ngor, who had no previous acting experience, as well as Best Cinematography and Best Editing. At the 38th British Academy Film Awards, it won eight BAFTAs, including Best Film and Best Actor in a Leading Role for Ngor.

In 1999, the British Film Institute voted The Killing Fields the 100th greatest British film of the 20th century. In 2016, British film magazine Empire ranked it number 86 in their list of the 100 best British films.

Plot

In 1973 Phnom Penh, the Cambodian national army wages a civil war with the communist Khmer Rouge group. Dith Pran, a Cambodian journalist and interpreter for The New York Times, awaits the arrival of reporter Sydney Schanberg at the city's airport, but leaves suddenly. Schanberg takes a cab to his hotel where he meets up with photographer Al Rockoff. Pran meets Schanberg later and tells him that an American B-52 has allegedly bombed Neak Leung. After Schanberg and Pran go to the town and confirm the allegation, they are arrested when they try to photograph the execution of two Khmer Rouge operatives. They are eventually released and Schanberg is furious when the international press corps arrives with the U.S. Army.

Two years later, in 1975, the Phnom Penh embassies are evacuated in anticipation of the Khmer Rouge's arrival. Schanberg secures evacuation for Pran's family, but Pran insists on staying behind to help Schanberg. The Khmer Rouge move into the capital, ostensibly in peace. During a parade through the city, Schanberg and Rockoff are met by a detachment of the Khmer Rouge, who immediately arrest them. The group is taken to a back alley where prisoners are being held and executed. Pran, unharmed because he is a Cambodian civilian, negotiates to spare his friends' lives, and the group retreats to the French embassy. The Khmer Rouge orders all Cambodian citizens in the embassy to be handed over, to which the fearful ambassador complies. Knowing that Pran will be imprisoned or killed, Rockoff and fellow photographer Jon Swain try to forge a British passport for Pran, but the deception fails when Pran's image on the passport photo disappears, as they lack adequate photographic fixer. Pran is turned over to the Khmer Rouge and forced to live under their totalitarian regime.

Several months after returning to New York City, Schanberg launches a personal campaign to locate Pran; he writes letters to several charities and maintains close contact with Pran's family in San Francisco. In Cambodia, Pran has become a forced labourer under the Khmer Rouge's "Year Zero" policy, a return to the agrarian ways of the past. Pran is also forced to attend propagandist classes where many undergo re-education. As intellectuals are made to disappear, Pran feigns simple-mindedness. Eventually, he tries to escape and stumbles upon one of the Pol Pot regime's Killing Fields before he is recaptured. In 1976, Schanberg is awarded a Pulitzer Prize for his coverage of the Cambodian conflict, and he tells the audience that half the recognition for the award belongs to Pran. Rockoff confronts Schanberg and harshly accuses him of not doing enough to locate Pran and for using his friend to win the award. Although Schanberg initially defends his efforts, he ultimately admits that Pran stayed because of what Schanberg wanted.

Pran is assigned to the leader of a different prison compound, a man named Phat, and charged mostly with tending to Phat's young son. Pran continues to behave as an uneducated peasant, despite several attempts by Phat to catch him in his deception. Phat begins to trust Pran and asks him to take ward of his son in the event that he is killed. During the Khmer Rouge's border war with Vietnam, Pran discovers that Phat's son has American money and a map leading to safety. When Phat tries to stop the younger Khmer Rouge officers from killing several of his comrades, he is ignominiously shot. In the confusion, Pran escapes with four other prisoners and they begin a long trek through the jungle with Phat's son. The group later splits and three of them head in a different direction; Pran continues following the map with the fourth man. However, Pran's companion activates a hidden land mine while holding the boy. As Pran pleads with the man to give him the boy, the mine goes off, killing the pair. Pran continues through the jungle alone until he eventually finds a Red Cross refugee camp near the border of Thailand. In the United States, Schanberg learns that Pran is alive and safe, and reunites with Pran at the Red Cross camp. Pran assures Schanberg of his forgiveness as the two embrace.

Cast

Production
In an interview with The Guardian in November 2014, Joffé said:

David Puttnam asked to see me, which in those days was a bit like being invited out to Hollywood. He gave me Bruce Robinson's script, which was enormous, but it was so full of passion and energy I couldn't put it down. I'd heard about Cambodia and the Khmer Rouge, but didn't know much until I read it. I wrote to David saying that whoever made the film would have to be careful because it wasn't just a war story: it was about human connection, how friendships are born and what they do to us. I didn't hear from him for six months, then we bumped into one another and he said he'd interviewed most of the directors in the world – including some very big names who would make the studios happy – but no one had really understood it. "You're the only man who has," he said.

In the same interview actor Julian Sands said:

Roland's audition process was extraordinary. I was 24 and I've never come across anything as rigorous since. He was looking to put together a troupe of actors without much film experience, because he wanted the freshness of everything to resonate with us. He would gather lots of us in his office to improvise scenes. After about a month, he had a group he found interesting. John Malkovich, Sam Waterston and Haing S. Ngor weren't subject to that, but their meetings with him were still pretty intense. A lot was made of the fact that Haing hadn't acted before, but John put it differently: he said Haing had been acting his whole life – you had to be a pretty good actor to survive the Khmer Rouge.

Box office
Goldcrest Films invested £8,419,000 in the film and received £10,664,000.

Critical reception
The Killing Fields holds a 93% rating at the review aggregator Rotten Tomatoes, based on 40 reviews, with the consensus: "Artfully composed, powerfully acted, and fueled by a powerful blend of anger and empathy, The Killing Fields is a career-defining triumph for director Roland Joffé and a masterpiece of cinema." Critic Roger Ebert wrote in the Chicago Sun-Times: "The film is a masterful achievement on all the technical levels—it does an especially good job of convincing us with its Asian locations—but the best moments are the human ones, the conversations, the exchanges of trust, the waiting around, the sudden fear, the quick bursts of violence, the desperation." John Simon of National Review wrote: "For all its flaws The Killing Fields is an important, indeed necessary, film".

The film has been criticized by some who lived through the actual events. The real Al Rockoff expressed dissatisfaction at the portrayals of himself and Schanberg, while Denis Cameron sought to have his consultative credit removed upon watching the completed film.

The Japanese filmmaker Akira Kurosawa cited this movie as one of his 100 favorite films.

Accolades

Besides its place as 100th on the BFI Top 100 British films list, The Killing Fields is also 30th on Channel 4's list of the 100 Greatest Tearjerkers, and 60th on the AFI's 100 Years...100 Cheers list.

Home media
The Killing Fields was released on DVD by Umbrella Entertainment in Australia in March 2010. The DVD includes special features such as the theatrical trailer, audio commentary with Roland Joffé, an interview with David Puttnam and a BBC documentary titled The Making of The Killing Fields. In April 2013 Umbrella Entertainment released the film on Blu-ray in Australia.

In the UK, the film was released on DVD and Blu-ray by Optimum Releasing and was released in North America on DVD by Warner Brothers, as part of their Warner Archive Collection.

Casting of Haing S. Ngor 

Haing S. Ngor, who plays Pran, was himself a survivor of the Khmer Rouge regime and the labour camps. Prior to the Khmer Rouge's 'Year Zero' he was a doctor based in Phnom Penh. In 1975, Ngor was one of millions who were moved from the city to forced labour camps in the countryside. He spent four years there before fleeing to Thailand.

Haing S. Ngor had never acted before appearing in The Killing Fields. He was spotted by the film's casting director, Pat Golden, at a Cambodian wedding in Los Angeles.

Of his role in the film, he told People magazine in 1985: "I wanted to show the world how deep starvation is in Cambodia, how many people die under Communist regime. My heart is satisfied. I have done something perfect."

Ngor became one of only two non-professional actors to win an Academy Award for acting, the other being Harold Russell (The Best Years of Our Lives, 1946).

Related work
The screenplay is adapted from a Sydney Schanberg story in The New York Times Magazine entitled "The Death and Life of Dith Pran: A Story of Cambodia".

In 1986, actor Spalding Gray, who had a small role in the film as the American consul, created Swimming to Cambodia, a monologue (later filmed by Jonathan Demme) based upon his experiences making The Killing Fields.

A book of the film was written by Christopher Hudson.

See also
 Alive in the Killing Fields (book)
 Shadow of Darkness
 BFI Top 100 British films
 List of historical drama films of Asia

References

External links

 
 
 
 Film review by Tim Dirks
 Mike Oldfield Discography (Tubular.net) – The Killing Fields
 The Killing Fields at DVD Resurrections, by Fingers.

1984 films
1980s war drama films
1980s historical drama films
1980s biographical drama films
British war drama films
British war epic films
British biographical drama films
1980s French-language films
Khmer-language films
Films directed by Roland Joffé
1980s political drama films
Best Film BAFTA Award winners
Biographical films about photojournalists
Biographical films about war correspondents
Films about communism
Films critical of communism
Films based on newspaper and magazine articles
Films featuring a Best Supporting Actor Academy Award-winning performance
Films featuring a Best Supporting Actor Golden Globe winning performance
Films produced by David Puttnam
Films set in Cambodia
Films set in the 1970s
Films whose cinematographer won the Best Cinematography Academy Award
Films whose editor won the Best Film Editing Academy Award
Films whose writer won the Best Adapted Screenplay BAFTA Award
Goldcrest Films films
Warner Bros. films
Films shot in Thailand
Films shot in Bangkok
Killing Fields
Vietnam War films
Films about the Cambodian genocide
British historical drama films
1980s English-language films
1980s British films